Pomacocha District is one of the nineteen districts of the Andahuaylas Province in Peru.

Geography 
Other mountains are listed below:

Ethnic groups 
The people in the district are mainly indigenous citizens of Quechua descent. Quechua is the language which the majority of the population (86.62%) learnt to speak in childhood, 12.83% of the residents started speaking using the Spanish language (2007 Peru Census).

Archaeology 
The archaeological site of Awkimarka contains ruins of the Chanka period.

References

Districts of the Andahuaylas Province
Districts of the Apurímac Region